Washington Spring Road–Woods Road Historic District is a national historic district located at Palisades in Rockland County, New York.  It encompasses 36 contributing buildings located in a narrow valley to the west of the hamlet.  It contains residential and religious properties of architectural and historic significance dating from the 18th century to the first third of the 20th.

It was listed on the National Register of Historic Places in 1990.

References

Historic districts on the National Register of Historic Places in New York (state)
Houses on the National Register of Historic Places in New York (state)
Gothic Revival architecture in New York (state)
Historic districts in Rockland County, New York
Houses in Rockland County, New York
National Register of Historic Places in Rockland County, New York